Mokabbir Khan is a Bangladeshi politician who has served as Member of Parliament for Sylhet-2 since January 2019. He is a member of Gano Forum.

Biography
Khan was born in Balaganj, Sylhet District into a Bengali Muslim family. His parents are Muhammad Firuz Khan and Muhibunnisa Khanom.

Khan was elected to parliament for the Sylhet-2 constituency, as a Gano Forum candidate, on 30 December 2018, defeating Yahya Chowdhury. His taking of the oath of parliament was criticised by his party which had decided to not attend parliament. He is a member of Parliamentary Library Committee.

References

Gano Forum politicians
Living people
11th Jatiya Sangsad members
Year of birth missing (living people)
People from Bishwanath Upazila